Bo Johan Peter Arneng (born 14 June 1979) is a Swedish former professional footballer who played as a midfielder. He won two Allsvenskan titles, two Svenska Cupen titles, and two Norwegian Football Cup titles during a career that spanned between 1999 and 2014. A full international between 2004 and 2005, he won two caps for the Sweden national team.

Club career 

After a spell with the Empoli FC's youth organization, Arneng began his senior career with Raufoss IL in the Norwegian Second Division. He signed with Vålerenga in 2002, and helped the team win the 2002 Norwegian Football Cup. After only one season in the Norwegian Premier Division, Arneng signed with Allsvenskan side Djurgårdens IF in 2003. While with Djurgårdens IF, he would go on and win the 2003 and 2005 Allsvenskan titles, as well as the 2004 and 2005 Svenska Cupen titles. In 2008, he left Sweden to yet again play in Norway, this time for Aalesund with which he ended up winning the 2009 Norwegian Football Cup. After three years in Norway, Arneng rounded off his career with stints with Syrianska and IK Sirius before retiring in 2014.

International career 
Arneng featured three times for the Sweden U19 team in 1997. He made his full international debut for the Sweden national team on 22 January 2004, playing for 90 minutes in a friendly 0–3 loss against Norway. He won his second and final cap on 17 August 2005, replacing Henrik Larsson in the 84th minute of a friendly 2–1 win against the Czech Republic.

Career statistics

International

Honours 
Vålerenga

 Norwegian Football Cup: 2002

Djurgårdens IF
 Allsvenskan: 2003, 2005
 Svenska Cupen: 2004, 2005

Aalesund
Norwegian Football Cup: 2009
Individual
 Swedish Newcomer of the Year: 2003
 Årets Järnkamin: 2005

References

1979 births
Living people
People from Uddevalla Municipality
Swedish footballers
Sweden international footballers
Association football midfielders
Empoli F.C. players
Raufoss IL players
Vålerenga Fotball players
Djurgårdens IF Fotboll players
Aalesunds FK players
Syrianska FC players
Eliteserien players
Allsvenskan players
Swedish expatriate footballers
Expatriate footballers in Norway
Swedish expatriate sportspeople in Norway
Expatriate footballers in Italy
Swedish expatriate sportspeople in Italy
IK Sirius Fotboll players
Sportspeople from Västra Götaland County